There are thirty species of amphibians recorded in Russia.

List of species

Order Caudata

Family Hynobiidae 
 Genus Salamandrella
 Siberian salamander (Salamandrella keyserlingii)
 Schrenck Siberian salamander (Salamandrella schrenckii)
 Genus Onychodactylus
 Fischer's clawed salamander (Onychodactylus fischeri)

Family Salamandridae 
 Genus Lissotriton
 Smooth newt (Lissotriton vulgaris)
 Genus Ommatotriton
 Southern banded newt (Ommatotriton vittatus)
 Genus Triturus
 Northern crested newt (Triturus cristatus)
 Southern crested newt (Triturus karelinii)

Order Anura

Family Bombinatoridae 
 Genus Bombina
 European fire-bellied toad (Bombina bombina)
 Oriental fire-bellied toad (Bombina orientalis)

Family Pelobatidae 
 Genus Pelobates
 Common spadefoot (Pelobates fuscus)
 Eastern spadefoot (Pelobates syriacus)

Family Pelodytidae 
 Genus Pelodytes
 Caucasian parsley frog (Pelodytes caucasicus)

Family Bufonidae 
 Genus Bufo
 Common toad (Bufo bufo)
 Caucasian toad (Bufo verrucosissimus) 
 Asiatic toad (Bufo gargarizans)
 European green toad (Bufo viridis)
 Natterjack toad (Bufo calamita)
 Mongolian toad (Bufo raddei)

Family Hylidae 
 Genus Hyla 
 European tree frog (Hyla arborea)
 Japanese tree frog (Hyla japonica)

Family Ranidae 
 Genus Rana 
 Common frog (Rana temporaria)
 Moor frog (Rana arvalis)
 Long-legged wood frog (Rana macrocnemis)
 Siberian wood frog (Rana amurensis) 
 Dybowski's frog (Rana dybowskii) 
 Hokkaidō frog (Rana pirica)
 Genus Pelophylax 
 Marsh frog (Pelophylax ridibundus)
 Pool frog (Pelophylax lessonae)
 Edible frog (Pelophylax kl. esculentus)
 Dark-spotted frog (Pelophylax nigromaculatus)

References 

Amphibians
Russia
Russia
Russia